There are thousands of national Scouting organizations or federations; these are grouped into six international Scouting associations with some non-aligned organizations. Many of these use Scout Association in their name:
 World Organization of the Scout Movement
 List of World Organization of the Scout Movement members
 World Association of Girl Guides and Girl Scouts
 List of World Association of Girl Guides and Girl Scouts members
 International Union of Guides and Scouts of Europe
 World Federation of Independent Scouts
 Order of World Scouts
 Confederation of European Scouts
 List of non-aligned Scouting organizations